Cymindis rhatica is a species of ground beetle in the subfamily Harpalinae. It was described by Antoine in 1936.

References

rhatica
Beetles described in 1936